Sing Sing Sing is a 1992 live album by Mel Tormé.

Track listing 
 "Lulu's Back in Town" (Al Dubin, Harry Warren) – 4:29
 "Memories of You" (Eubie Blake, Andy Razaf) – 5:04
 "It's All Right with Me"/"Love" (Cole Porter)/(Ralph Blane, Hugh Martin) – 3:27
 "These Foolish Things (Remind Me of You)" (Harry Link, Holt Marvell, Jack Strachey) – 5:00
 All Medley: "All the Things You Are"/"All of You"/"All of Me" (Jerome Kern, Oscar Hammerstein II)/(Porter)/(Gerald Marks, Seymour Simons) – 4:32
 Tribute to Benny Goodman: "Stompin' at the Savoy"/"Don't Be That Way"/"And the Angels Sing"/Gotta Be This or That"/"Jersey Bounce"/"Why Don't You Do Right"/"Avalon"/"Sing Sing Sing" (Razaf, Edgar Sampson)/(Benny Goodman, Sampson, Mitchell Parish)/(Ziggy Elman, Johnny Mercer)/(Sunny Skylar)/(Tiny Bradshaw, Buddy Feyne, Edward Johnson, Bobby Plater)/(Kansas Joe McCoy)/(Al Jolson, Buddy DeSylva, Vincent Rose)/(Louis Prima) – 14:34
 "Get Happy" (Harold Arlen, Ted Koehler) – 3:30
 "Three Little Words" (Bert Kalmar, Harry Ruby) – 3:39
 "Guess I'll Hang My Tears Out to Dry" (Sammy Cahn, Jule Styne) – 5:14
 "Lover, Come Back to Me" (Hammerstein, Sigmund Romberg) – 5:16
 "Ev'ry Time We Say Goodbye" (Porter) – 2:54

Personnel 
 Mel Tormé - vocals
 Ken Peplowski - clarinet
 Peter Appleyard - vibraphone
 John Leitham - double bass
 John Colianni - piano
 Donny Osborne - drums

References 

Mel Tormé live albums
1992 live albums
Concord Records live albums